Megachile peruviana is a species of bee in the family Megachilidae. It was described by Smith in 1879.

References

Peruviana
Insects described in 1879